Judah Löb Mieses of Lemberg was one of the most prominent Maskilim of Galicia. He was a man of wealth and education, and made his house the center of a literary circle. He encouraged and aided Isaac Erter and other young men who showed eagerness for knowledge and selfculture, and he offered them the use of his valuable library.

Mieses was a fluent Hebrew writer and a strong opponent of Hasidism. He was the author of "Kin'at ha-Emet" (Vienna, 1828; 2d ed., Lemberg, 1879), containing an introduction and three dialogues between Maimonides and Solomon of Chelm, author of "Merkebet ha-Mishneh" (Salonica, 1777). In this work Mieses pleads for pure Judaism free from all superstitious belief in spirits, dreams, demons, witchcraft, metempsychosis, etc., which in the course of time had obscured the light of the sublime religion. He sharply criticizes the zaddik for spreading the grossest superstition among the Hasidim, and for exploiting the credulity of the ignorant masses. The author evinces a wide acquaintance with Jewish and general literature; and he appends to his book, under the title "Likkute Ferahim," extracts from the writings of Judah ha-Levi, Joseph ibn Ezra, Kimhi, Albo, Abravanel, Joseph Delmedigo, and others, in support of his own views. He wrote also additions to David Caro's "Tekunat ha-Rabbanim".

References

Bibliography

Benjaeob, Ozar ha-Sefarim, p. 530; Bikkure ha-Ittim, xi. 136-142, Vienna, 1830
First, Bibl. Jud. li. 377; Ueiger, Melo Chofnajim, pp. xlviii., 51, and Hebrew text, p. 6, Berlin, 1840
Gratz, Geseh. xi. 425-428, 488, Leipsic, Kerem Hemed, pp. 124-134, Vienna, 1833; Letteris, in Erter, Ocsammelte Schriften. p. v., Vienna, 1864
Zeitlin, Bibl Post-Mendels. p. 239.

Attribution

1831 deaths
Jews from Galicia (Eastern Europe)
Writers from Lviv
People of the Haskalah